Småsponen Nunatak is a nunatak just northwest of Storsponen Nunatak, at the north side of Mount Hochlin in the Mühlig-Hofmann Mountains of Queen Maud Land. It was mapped from surveys and air photos by the Norwegian Antarctic Expedition (1956–60) and named Småsponen ("the little chip").

References

Nunataks of Queen Maud Land
Princess Martha Coast